The canton of Crest is an administrative division of the Drôme department, southeastern France. It was created at the French canton reorganisation which came into effect in March 2015. Its seat is in Crest.

It consists of the following communes:
 
Aouste-sur-Sye
Autichamp
Barcelonne
La Baume-Cornillane
Beaufort-sur-Gervanne
Chabrillan
Châteaudouble
Cobonne
Combovin
Crest
Divajeu
Eurre
Gigors-et-Lozeron
Grane
Mirabel-et-Blacons
Montclar-sur-Gervanne
Montmeyran
Montvendre
Omblèze
Ourches
Peyrus
Piégros-la-Clastre
Plan-de-Baix
La Répara-Auriples
La Roche-sur-Grane
Suze
Upie
Vaunaveys-la-Rochette

References

Cantons of Drôme